The consensus 1976 College Basketball All-American team, as determined by aggregating the results of four major All-American teams.  To earn "consensus" status, a player must win honors from a majority of the following teams: the Associated Press, the USBWA, The United Press International and the National Association of Basketball Coaches.

1976 Consensus All-America team

Individual All-America teams

AP Honorable Mention:

 Otis Birdsong, Houston
 Quinn Buckner, Indiana
 Mike Dabney, Rutgers
 Lee Dixon, Hardin–Simmons
 James Edwards, Washington
 Alex English, South Carolina
 Jeff Fosnes, Vanderbilt
 Rickey Green, Michigan
 Ernie Grunfeld, Tennessee
 Matt Hicks, Northern Illinois
 Armond Hill, Princeton
 George Johnson, St. John's
 Marques Johnson, UCLA
 Eddie Jordan, Rutgers
 Tom Lockhart, Manhattan
 Mike McConathy, Louisiana Tech
 Eddie Owens, UNLV
 Sonny Parker, Texas A&M
 Sam Pellom, Buffalo
 Mike Phillips, Kentucky
 Anthony Roberts, Oral Roberts
 Marshall Rogers, Texas–Pan American
 Tree Rollins, Clemson
 Lonnie Shelton, Oregon State
 Willie Smith, Missouri
 Mychal Thompson, Minnesota
 Todd Tripucka, Lafayette
 Wally Walker, Virginia
 Lloyd Walton, Marquette
 Bob Wilkerson, Indiana
 Chuckie Williams, Kansas State
 Freeman Williams, Portland State

See also
 1975–76 NCAA Division I men's basketball season

References

NCAA Men's Basketball All-Americans
All-Americans